The Evangelical Review of Theology and Politics is a peer-reviewed, scholarly theological journal formerly published by the King's Evangelical Divinity SchoolEngland, but is now published by Stephen M. Vantassel United States. It is published annually with content being provided as available in electronic format delivered online. The journal is open-access meaning that authors and readers do not have to pay to access content. The journal defined its scope as "scholarly evangelical analysis of contemporary theological and political issues".. While the journal has evangelical Christian roots, it does not require theological agreement of writers/submitters. The journal is open to all authors of all faith traditions who have meaningful and researched information on theological and/or political issues.

Book reviews are likewise open-access.

It replaced by a similar journal Evangelical Review of Society and Politics and published by the same source.

External links 
 Evangelical Review of Theology and Politics website where many issues relevant to the journal are posted.

Publications established in 2012
Protestant studies journals
Protestantism and politics
Sociology of religion
Evangelical magazines